Kenbyōin-mae is a Hiroden station (tram stop) on Hiroden Ujina Line, located in Minami-ku, Hiroshima.

Routes
From Kenbyōin-mae Station, there are three of Hiroden Streetcar routes.

 Hiroshima Station - Hiroshima Port Route
 Hiroden-nishi-hiroshima - Hiroshima Port Route
 Hiroshima Station - (via Hijiyama-shita) - Hiroshima Port Route

Connections
█ Ujina Line
  
Hirodaifuzokugakkō-mae — Kenbyōin-mae — Ujina 2-chōme

Around station
Hiroshima Prefectural Hospital
Prefectural University of Hiroshima
Ujina Post Office
JUSCO Miyuki

History
Opened as "Koryo-chugaku-mae" on November 27, 1935.
Renamed to the present name "Kenbyoin-mae" in 1948.

See also
Hiroden Streetcar Lines and Routes
List of railway stations in Japan

External links

Kenbyoin-mae Station
Railway stations in Japan opened in 1935